A fourteen-segment display (FSD) (sometimes referred to as a starburst display or Union Jack display) is a type of display based on 14 segments that can be turned on or off to produce letters and numerals. It is an expansion of the more common seven-segment display, having an additional four diagonal and two vertical segments with the middle horizontal segment broken in half. A seven-segment display suffices for numerals and certain letters, but unambiguously rendering the ISO basic Latin alphabet requires more detail. A slight variation is the sixteen-segment display which allows additional legibility in displaying letters or other symbols.

A decimal point or comma may be present as an additional segment, or pair of segments; the comma (used for triple-digit groupings or as a decimal separator in many regions) is commonly formed by combining the decimal point with a closely 'attached' leftwards-descending arc-shaped segment.

Electronic alphanumeric displays may use LEDs, LCDs, or vacuum fluorescent display devices. The LED variant is typically manufactured in single or dual character packages, allowing the system designer to choose the number of characters suiting the application.

Often a character generator is used to translate 7-bit ASCII character codes to the 14 bits that indicate which of the 14 segments to turn on or off.

Character encoding 

By lighting different elements, different characters can be displayed.

In a 14-segment display, there is also an optional 15th segment which is a decimal point (denoted as "DP").

Decimal

Latin alphabet 

A 14-segment display is mostly used to display text because the 14 elements allow all Latin letters to be displayed both in upper case and lower case (with a few exceptions like "s").

Applications

Multiple-segment display devices use fewer elements than a full dot-matrix display, and may produce a better character appearance where the segments are shaped appropriately. This can reduce power consumption and the number of driver components.

Fourteen-segment gas-plasma displays were used in pinball machines from 1986 through 1991 with an additional comma and period part making for a total of 16 segments.

Fourteen and sixteen-segment displays were used to produce alphanumeric characters on calculators and other embedded systems.  Applications today include displays fitted to telephone Caller ID units, gymnasium equipment, VCRs, car stereos, microwave ovens, slot machines, and DVD players.

Such displays were very common on pinball machines for displaying the score and other information, before the widespread use of dot-matrix display panels.

Incandescent lamp
Multiple segment alphanumeric displays are nearly as old as the use of electricity. A 1908 textbook  describes an alphanumeric display system using incandescent lamps and a mechanical switching arrangement. Each of 21 lamps was connected to a switch operated by a set of slotted bars, installed in a rotating drum.  This commutator assembly could be arranged so that as the drum was rotated, different sets of switches were closed and different letters and figures could be displayed.  The scheme would have been used for "talking" signs to spell out messages, but a complete set of commutator switches, drums and lamps would have been required for each letter of a message, making the resulting sign quite expensive.

Cold-cathode neon
A few different versions of the fourteen segment display exist as cold-cathode neon lamps.  For example, one type made by Burroughs Corporation was called "Panaplex".  Instead of using a filament as the incandescent versions do, these use a cathode charged to a 180 V potential which causes the electrified segment to glow a bright orange color. They operated similarly to Nixie tubes but instead of the full-formed numeric shapes, used segments to make up numerals and letters.

Examples

See also 

 Seven-segment display
 Eight-segment display
 Nine-segment display
 Sixteen-segment display
 Dot matrix display
 Nixie tube display
 Vacuum fluorescent display

References

External links

Display technology